The Pukguksong-3 (KN-26 under the U.S. naming convention) is a North Korean two-stage, submarine-launched ballistic missile, likely based on the same motor that powers the Pukkuksong-2. The missile had its first successful flight test on 2 October 2019, although it had been featured in parades in 2017. Compared to older missiles, the Pukguksong-3 likely represents an incremental step forward in SLBM development, possibly towards an eventual, standardised missile.

Design 
The Pukguksong-3 is a further development from the Pukguksong-2, sharing the same 1.4-metre diameter. The missiles were first shown on the 15 April 2017 parade with an appearance like that of the Pukguksong-1, but larger, and painted with an uninterrupted black stripe at the nose. The paraded missiles had a skirt with grid fins.

More was shown in 22 August, when images of filament wound casing were shown with a larger diameter of 1.4 meters, along with the official name of the missile, on a display in the background of a photo. The image showed a Pukguksong-3 missile in a canister and revealed that it would be a two-stage, solid-fuel missile. Prior to this, there was a string of ejection tests at Sinpo, although it could not be confirmed that the testing involved the Pukguksong-3.

A different report states that the Pukguksong-3 is intended to move away from the Pukguksong-1 design, instead of following up on it. According to this analysis, the missile is a new platform that would likely improve North Korea's second strike capability.

The missile was displayed in the 'Self-Defence' 2021 exhibition, between a Pukguksong-5 and the newer, KN-23 like SLBM. The originally uninterrupted black line was broken with a white stripe, possibly at an attempt with deception.

Tests 
There has been one known test of the Pukguksong-3:

Deployment 
The missile is likely to be deployed to the new Sinpo-C submarine under construction, as the current Sinpo-B submarine, which fits the Pukguksong-1 missile, would not fit the larger Pukguksong-3 missile. The new ballistic missile submarine is based on the Romeo-class submarine, and is likely to be fitted with three launch tubes for missiles. However, the position of the tubes would likely result in reduced space for the battery compartment, and thus reduce its underwater endurance, possibly reducing it to half of the original capacity. As the submarine is still under construction, it may instead be launched to fire the newer, and even larger Pukguksong-5 missiles instead. Even with these modifications, however, it is unlikely that the Romeo-class submarine will reach 3000 tons as reported by South Korean media, and as such, a possibility of a conversion based on a Golf-class submarine is also possible.

Variants

Pukguksong-4 
At the 10 October 2020 parade commemorating the 75th anniversary of the founding of the Korean Workers' Party, a new missile marked the Pukguksong-4 was displayed. It is significantly increased in size compared to the Pukguksong-3, both in diameter and length. Unlike the Pukguksong-3, it was seen with a Korean People's Army Ground Force escort and the missile did not appear to have an actual separation mechanism for its two stages. Portions of the engine appeared to be filament wound to make the missile lighter and allow for a greater range and payload. Range is likely to be similar or greater than the Pukguksong-3, although no flight tests have yet been conducted. South Korean Chief of Naval Operations Boo Suk-jong mentioned that korean alphabet written on the cover of this missile is '북극성-4ㅅ'(Pukkuksong-4Siot), not '북극성-4A'(Pukkuksong-4A). Also he mentioned that letter 'ㅅ' may stand for 수중(submarine, underwater) or 수상(on the water)

Pukguksong-5 
At a parade on 14 January 2021, another SLBM variant was displayed designated the Pukguksong-5. It shared the design of the previous two missiles, however with a pointed nose cone and longer payload shroud for a greater overall length. The appearance of yet another untested missile likely indicates North Korea is still in the process of settling on a specific SLBM design.

See also 
UGM-73 Poseidon

References 

Submarine-launched ballistic missiles
Ballistic missiles of North Korea
Submarine-launched ballistic missiles of North Korea
Military equipment introduced in the 2010s